The Treaty of Rapallo was a treaty between the Kingdom of Italy and the Kingdom of Serbs, Croats and Slovenes (renamed Yugoslavia in 1929) that was signed to solve the dispute over some territories in the former Austrian Littoral, which was in the northern Adriatic, as well as in Dalmatia.

The treaty was signed on 12 November 1920 in Rapallo, near Genoa, Italy. The signing was preceded by Italo-Yugoslavian negotiations at Villa Spinola, which were led notably by Ivanoe Bonomi and Francesco Salata.

Background
Tension between Italy and Yugoslavia arose at the end of the First World War, when the Austria-Hungary dissolved, and Italy claimed the territories assigned to it by the secret Treaty of London. According to the treaty signed in London on 26 April 1915 by the Kingdom of Italy and Triple Entente, in case of victory at the end of the war, Italy was to obtain several territorial gains including former Austrian Littoral (except Krk and Prvić island), northern Dalmatia and notably Zadar, Šibenik, and most of the Dalmatian islands (except Sveti Grgur, Goli Otok, Rab, Drvenik Mali, Drvenik Veli, Čiovo, Šolta, Brač, Jakljan and Koločep).

The territories had an ethnically-mixed population, with Slovenes and Croats being over the half of the population of the region. The treaty was therefore nullified with the Treaty of Versailles under the pressure of US President Woodrow Wilson, which voided Italian claims on northern Dalmatia. The objective of the Treaty of Rapallo was to find a compromise after the void created by the nonapplication of the Treaty of London.

Content

At the conclusions of the discussions, the following territories were annexed to Italy:
The western parts of the former Duchy of Carniola: more than half of the region of Inner Carniola, with the municipalities of Idrija, Vipava, Šturje, Postojna, Šent Peter na Krasu (now Pivka), and Ilirska Bistrica and the municipality in Upper Carniola of Fusine in Valromana
The entire territory of the former Austrian Littoral except for the municipality of Kastav and the island of Krk, which were ceded to the Kingdom of Serbs, Croats and Slovenes
The former Dalmatian capital city of Zadar and the small Dalmatian islands of Lastovo and Palagruža.

According to the treaty, the city of Rijeka would become the independent Free State of Fiume, which ended the military occupation of Gabriele d'Annunzio's troops that had begun by the Impresa di Fiume and was known as the Italian Regency of Carnaro. That part of the treaty was revoked in 1924, when Italy and Yugoslavia signed the Treaty of Rome, which gave Fiume to Italy and the adjacent port of Sušak to Yugoslavia.

The treaty left a large number of Slovenes and Croats in Italy. According to author Paul N. Hehn, "the treaty left half a million Slavs inside Italy while only a few hundred Italians in the fledgling Yugoslav state". Indeed, based on the numbers recorded in the 1910 Austrian census, 480,000 South Slavs (Slovenes and Croats) became citizens of the Kingdom of Italy, and around 15,000 Italians became citizens of the new Yugoslav state (around 13,000 in Dalmatia and the rest in the island of Krk). According to the same census, around 25,000 ethnic Germans and 3,000 Hungarians also lived in the regions annexed to Italy with the treaty, and the number of Italians living in the region was between 350,000 and 390,000.

References

External links

Treaty between the Kingdom of Italy and the Kingdom of the Serbs, Croats and Slovenes signed at Rapallo, 12 November 1920
Map of Europe and Treaty of Rapallo  at omniatlas.com
Map of modern Slovenia with superimposed Rapallo border

1920 in Yugoslavia
Modern history of Italy
Political history of Slovenia
1920 in Italy
Interwar-period treaties
Treaties concluded in 1920
Rapallo (1920)
Treaties of the Kingdom of Yugoslavia
Italy–Yugoslavia relations
Italians of Croatia
Rapallo
Adriatic question